Cambusdoon New Ground is a cricket ground located in Ayr, Scotland. It is the home of Ayr Cricket Club and hosted three One Day Internationals (ODI) in August 2006 as part of the European Cricket Championship tournament.

History

In 2006, Cambusdoon and Mannofield were Scottish grounds to be formally approved by the International Cricket Council (ICC) to host One Day International matches.

Cambusdoon is the home of Ayr Cricket Club and hosted three European Cricket Championship matches involving Scotland, Ireland and the Netherlands in August 2006. It also hosted two ODI matches in 2010 between Scotland and Afghanistan.

In July 2012, Scotland's two ICC World Cricket League (WCL) fixtures against Canada were moved to Ayr Cricket Club after The Grange in Edinburgh was declared unplayable.

In February 2017, Cricket Scotland confirmed that the ground would host the 2015–17 ICC Intercontinental Cup match between Scotland and Namibia, scheduled to take place in June.

International centuries
There have been two ODI centuries scored at the venue.

List of five-wicket hauls
There has only been one five-wicket haul at the venue.

References 

Cricket grounds in Scotland
Sports venues in Ayr